In chemistry and thermodynamics, calorimetry is the science or act of measuring changes in state variables of a body for the purpose of deriving the heat transfer associated with changes of its state due, for example, to chemical reactions, physical changes, or phase transitions under specified constraints. Calorimetry is performed with a calorimeter. Scottish physician and scientist Joseph Black, who was the first to recognize the distinction between heat and temperature, is said to be the founder of the science of calorimetry.

Indirect calorimetry calculates heat that living organisms produce by measuring either their production of carbon dioxide and nitrogen waste (frequently ammonia in aquatic organisms, or urea in terrestrial ones), or from their consumption of oxygen. 
Lavoisier noted in 1780 that heat production can be predicted from oxygen consumption this way, using multiple regression. The dynamic energy budget theory explains why this procedure is correct. Heat generated by living organisms may also be measured by direct calorimetry, in which the entire organism is placed inside the calorimeter for the measurement.

A widely used modern instrument is the differential scanning calorimeter, a device which allows thermal data to be obtained on small amounts of material. It involves heating the sample at a controlled rate and recording the heat flow either into or from the specimen.

Classical calorimetric calculation of heat

Cases with differentiable equation of state for a one-component body

Basic classical calculation with respect to volume

Calorimetry requires that a reference material that changes temperature have known definite thermal constitutive properties. The classical rule, recognized by Clausius and Kelvin, is that the pressure exerted by the calorimetric material is fully and rapidly determined solely by its temperature and volume; this rule is for changes that do not involve phase change, such as melting of ice. There are many materials that do not comply with this rule, and for them, the present formula of classical calorimetry does not provide an adequate account. Here the classical rule is assumed to hold for the calorimetric material being used, and the propositions are mathematically written:

The thermal response of the calorimetric material is fully described by its pressure  as the value of its constitutive function  of just the volume  and the temperature . All increments are here required to be very small. This calculation refers to a domain of volume and temperature of the body in which no phase change occurs, and there is only one phase present. An important assumption here is continuity of property relations. A different analysis is needed for phase change

where

 denotes the latent heat with respect to volume, of the calorimetric material at constant controlled temperature . The surroundings' pressure on the material is instrumentally adjusted to impose a chosen volume change, with initial volume . To determine this latent heat, the volume change is effectively the independently instrumentally varied quantity. This latent heat is not one of the widely used ones, but is of theoretical or conceptual interest.
 denotes the heat capacity, of the calorimetric material at fixed constant volume , while the pressure of the material is allowed to vary freely, with initial temperature . The temperature is forced to change by exposure to a suitable heat bath. This latent heat is one of the two widely used ones.

The latent heat with respect to volume is the heat required for unit increment in volume at constant temperature. It can be said to be 'measured along an isotherm', and the pressure the material exerts is allowed to vary freely, according to its constitutive law . For a given material, it can have a positive or negative sign or exceptionally it can be zero, and this can depend on the temperature, as it does for water about 4 C. The concept of latent heat with respect to volume was perhaps first recognized by Joseph Black in 1762. The term 'latent heat of expansion' is also used. The latent heat with respect to volume can also be called the 'latent energy with respect to volume'. For all of these usages of 'latent heat', a more systematic terminology uses 'latent heat capacity'.

The heat capacity at constant volume is the heat required for unit increment in temperature at constant volume. It can be said to be 'measured along an isochor', and again, the pressure the material exerts is allowed to vary freely. It always has a positive sign. This means that for an increase in the temperature of a body without change of its volume, heat must be supplied to it. This is consistent with common experience.

Quantities like  are sometimes called 'curve differentials', because they are measured along curves in the  surface.

Classical theory for constant-volume (isochoric) calorimetry
Constant-volume calorimetry is calorimetry performed at a constant volume. This involves the use of a constant-volume calorimeter. Heat is still measured by the above-stated principle of calorimetry.

This means that in a suitably constructed calorimeter, called a bomb calorimeter, the increment of volume  can be made to vanish, . For constant-volume calorimetry:

where

 denotes the increment in temperature and
 denotes the heat capacity at constant volume.

Classical heat calculation with respect to pressure

From the above rule of calculation of heat with respect to volume, there follows one with respect to pressure.

where

 denotes the latent heat with respect to pressure, of the calorimetric material at constant temperature, while the volume and pressure of the body are allowed to vary freely, at pressure  and temperature ;
 denotes the heat capacity, of the calorimetric material at constant pressure, while the temperature and volume of the body are allowed to vary freely, at pressure  and temperature .

The new quantities here are related to the previous ones:

where

and

It is common to refer to the ratio of specific heats as

Calorimetry through phase change, equation of state shows one jump discontinuity

An early calorimeter was that used by Laplace and Lavoisier, as shown in the figure above. It worked at constant temperature, and at atmospheric pressure. The latent heat involved was then not a latent heat with respect to volume or with respect to pressure, as in the above account for calorimetry without phase change. The latent heat involved in this calorimeter was with respect to phase change, naturally occurring at constant temperature. This kind of calorimeter worked by measurement of mass of water produced by the melting of ice, which is a phase change.

Cumulation of heating

This calculation is done by mathematical integration along the progression with respect to time. This is because increments of heat are 'additive'; but this does not mean that heat is a conservative quantity. The idea that heat was a conservative quantity was invented by Lavoisier, and is called the 'caloric theory'; by the middle of the nineteenth century it was recognized as mistaken.

One can write

.

Mathematical aspects of the above rules

These 'very small' quantities are used in the Leibniz approach to the infinitesimal calculus.

In terms of fluxions, the above first rule of calculation can be written

where

 denotes the time

 denotes the time rate of heating of the calorimetric material at time 

 denotes the time rate of change of volume of the calorimetric material at time 

 denotes the time rate of change of temperature of the calorimetric material.

The increment  and the fluxion  are obtained for a particular time  that determines the values of the quantities on the righthand sides of the above rules. But this is not a reason to expect that there should exist a mathematical function . For this reason, the increment  is said to be an 'imperfect differential' or an 'inexact differential'. Also, the notation đQ is used in some books. Carelessness about this can lead to error.

Although the fluxion  is defined here as a function of time , the symbols  and  respectively standing alone are not defined here.

Physical scope of the above rules of calorimetry

The above rules refer only to suitable calorimetric materials. The terms 'rapidly' and 'very small' call for empirical physical checking of the domain of validity of the above rules.

The above rules for the calculation of heat belong to pure calorimetry. They make no reference to thermodynamics, and were mostly understood before the advent of thermodynamics. They are the basis of the 'thermo' contribution to thermodynamics. The 'dynamics' contribution is based on the idea of work, which is not used in the above rules of calculation.

Experimentally conveniently measured coefficients

Empirically, it is convenient to measure properties of calorimetric materials under experimentally controlled conditions.

Pressure increase at constant volume

For measurements at experimentally controlled volume, one can use the assumption, stated above, that the pressure of the body of calorimetric material is can be expressed as a function of its volume and temperature.

For measurement at constant experimentally controlled volume, the isochoric coefficient of pressure rise with temperature, is defined by

Expansion at constant pressure

For measurements at experimentally controlled pressure, it is assumed that the volume  of the body of calorimetric material can be expressed as a function  of its temperature  and pressure . This assumption is related to, but is not the same as, the above used assumption that the pressure of the body of calorimetric material is known as a function of its volume and temperature; anomalous behaviour of materials can affect this relation.

The quantity that is conveniently measured at constant experimentally controlled pressure, the isobar volume expansion coefficient, is defined by

Compressibility at constant temperature

For measurements at experimentally controlled temperature, it is again assumed that the volume  of the body of calorimetric material can be expressed as a function  of its temperature  and pressure , with the same provisos as mentioned just above.

The quantity that is conveniently measured at constant experimentally controlled temperature, the isothermal compressibility, is defined by

Relation between classical calorimetric quantities

Assuming that the rule  is known, one can derive the function of  that is used above in the classical heat calculation with respect to pressure. This function can be found experimentally from the coefficients  and  through the mathematically deducible relation

.

Connection between calorimetry and thermodynamics

Thermodynamics developed gradually over the first half of the nineteenth century, building on the above theory of calorimetry which had been worked out before it, and on other discoveries. According to Gislason and Craig (2005): "Most thermodynamic data come from calorimetry..." According to Kondepudi (2008): "Calorimetry is widely used in present day laboratories."

Then it can be shown that one can write a thermodynamic version of the above calorimetric rules:

with

and

 .

Then, according to Adkins (1975), it can be shown that one can write a further thermodynamic version of the above calorimetric rules:

with

and

 .

Special interest of thermodynamics in calorimetry: the isothermal segments of a Carnot cycle

Calorimetry has a special benefit for thermodynamics. It tells about the heat absorbed or emitted in the isothermal segment of a Carnot cycle.

A Carnot cycle is a special kind of cyclic process affecting a body composed of material suitable for use in a heat engine. Such a material is of the kind considered in calorimetry, as noted above, that exerts a pressure that is very rapidly determined just by temperature and volume. Such a body is said to change reversibly. A Carnot cycle consists of four successive stages or segments:

(1) a change in volume from a volume  to a volume  at constant temperature  so as to incur a flow of heat into the body (known as an isothermal change)

(4) another adiabatic change of volume from  back to  just such as to return the body to its starting temperature .

In isothermal segment (1), the heat that flows into the body is given by

   

and in isothermal segment (3) the heat that flows out of the body is given by

.

Because the segments (2) and (4) are adiabats, no heat flows into or out of the body during them, and consequently the net heat supplied to the body during the cycle is given by

.

This quantity is used by thermodynamics and is related in a special way to the net work done by the body during the Carnot cycle. The net change of the body's internal energy during the Carnot cycle, is equal to zero, because the material of the working body has the special properties noted above.

Special interest of calorimetry in thermodynamics: relations between classical calorimetric quantities

Relation of latent heat with respect to volume, and the equation of state

The quantity , the latent heat with respect to volume, belongs to classical calorimetry. It accounts for the occurrence of energy transfer by work in a process in which heat is also transferred; the quantity, however, was considered before the relation between heat and work transfers was clarified by the invention of thermodynamics. In the light of thermodynamics, the classical calorimetric quantity is revealed as being tightly linked to the calorimetric material's equation of state . Provided that the temperature  is measured in the thermodynamic absolute scale, the relation is expressed in the formula

.

Difference of specific heats

Advanced thermodynamics provides the relation

.

From this, further mathematical and thermodynamic reasoning leads to another relation between classical calorimetric quantities. The difference of specific heats is given by

.

Practical constant-volume calorimetry (bomb calorimetry) for thermodynamic studies
Constant-volume calorimetry is calorimetry performed at a constant volume. This involves the use of a constant-volume calorimeter.

No work is performed in constant-volume calorimetry, so the heat measured equals the change in internal energy of the system. The heat capacity at constant volume is assumed to be independent of temperature.

Heat is measured by the principle of calorimetry.

where

ΔU is change in internal energy,
ΔT is change in temperature and
CV is the heat capacity at constant volume.
In constant-volume calorimetry the pressure is not held constant. If there is a pressure difference between initial and final states, the heat measured needs adjustment to provide the enthalpy change. One then has

where

ΔH is change in enthalpy and
V is the unchanging volume of the sample chamber.

See also

 Isothermal microcalorimetry (IMC)
 Isothermal titration calorimetry
 Sorption calorimetry
 Reaction calorimeter

References

Books
Adkins, C.J. (1975). Equilibrium Thermodynamics, second edition, McGraw-Hill, London, .
Bailyn, M. (1994). A Survey of Thermodynamics, American Institute of Physics, New York, .
Bryan, G.H. (1907). Thermodynamics. An Introductory Treatise dealing mainly with First Principles and their Direct Applications, B.G. Tuebner, Leipzig.
Callen, H.B. (1960/1985). Thermodynamics and an Introduction to Thermostatistics, second edition, Wiley, New York, .
Crawford, F.H. (1963). Heat, Thermodynamics, and Statistical Physics, Rupert Hart-Davis, London, Harcourt, Brace, & World.
Guggenheim, E.A. (1949/1967). Thermodynamics. An Advanced Treatment for Chemists and Physicists, North-Holland, Amsterdam.
Iribarne, J.V., Godson, W.L. (1973/1981), Atmospheric Thermodynamics, second edition, D. Reidel, Kluwer Academic Publishers, Dordrecht, .
Kondepudi, D. (2008). Introduction to Modern Thermodynamics, Wiley, Chichester, .
Landsberg, P.T. (1978). Thermodynamics and Statistical Mechanics, Oxford University Press, Oxford, .
Lewis, G.N., Randall, M. (1923/1961). Thermodynamics, second edition revised by K.S Pitzer, L. Brewer, McGraw-Hill, New York.
Maxwell, J.C. (1872). Theory of Heat, third edition, Longmans, Green, and Co., London.
Partington, J.R. (1949). An Advanced Treatise on Physical Chemistry, Volume 1, Fundamental Principles. The Properties of Gases, Longmans, Green, and Co., London.
Planck, M. (1923/1926). Treatise on Thermodynamics, third English edition translated by A. Ogg from the seventh German edition, Longmans, Green & Co., London.
Truesdell, C., Bharatha, S. (1977). The Concepts and Logic of Classical Thermodynamics as a Theory of Heat Engines, Rigorously Constructed upon the Foundation Laid by S. Carnot and F. Reech, Springer, New York, .

External links

 http://www.appropedia.org/Differential_scanning_calorimetry_protocol:_MOST

 
Heat transfer